Emmett Gerald Keefe (April 28, 1893 – September 11, 1965) was a guard in the National Football League.

Biography
Keefe was born on April 28, 1893, in Raub, Indiana. He died on September 11, 1965, at St. Luke's Hospital in Chicago, Illinois.

Career
Keefe played with the Chicago Tigers during the 1920 NFL season. He would split the following season between the Rock Island Independents and the Green Bay Packers. Again the next, he would split the season, this time between the Independents and the Milwaukee Badgers.

He played at the collegiate level at the University of Notre Dame.

See also
List of Chicago Tigers players
List of Rock Island Independents players
List of Green Bay Packers players
List of Milwaukee Badgers players

References

1893 births
1965 deaths
American football guards
Chicago Tigers players
Great Lakes Navy Bluejackets football players
Green Bay Packers players
Milwaukee Badgers players
Notre Dame Fighting Irish football players
Rock Island Independents players
People from Benton County, Indiana